Microtubule-associated protein 1S is a protein that in humans is encoded by the MAP1S gene.

Interactions 

MAP1S has been shown to interact with RASSF1.

References

Further reading